Fuss Peak is an active stratovolcano located on the southern end of Paramushir Island, Kuril Islands, Russia.

History 
The volcano was discovered in 1805 during the first Russian circumnavigation of the Earth and named in honor of a Swiss mathematician Nicolas Fuss, who served as the permanent secretary to the Academy of Sciences in St. Petersburg.
Only one unambiguous eruption, in 1854, is known. Fuss Peak is still active.

See also
 List of volcanoes in Russia
 List of ultras of Northeast Asia

References

Sources
 
 

Paramushir
Stratovolcanoes of Russia
Active volcanoes
Holocene stratovolcanoes